NGC 260 is a spiral galaxy located in the constellation Andromeda. It was discovered on August 27, 1865 by Heinrich d'Arrest.

References

External links
 

0260
Spiral galaxies
Andromeda (constellation)
002844